Aethalopteryx steniptera is a moth in the family Cossidae. It is found in Somalia.

References

Moths described in 1916
Aethalopteryx